Drilliola is a genus of sea snails, marine gastropod mollusks in the family Borsoniidae, the cone snails and their allies.

Species
Species within the genus Drilliola include:
  Drilliola annosa 
 Drilliola antarctica 
 Drilliola barnsi Poppe & Tagaro, 2021
  Drilliola basteroti  
  Drilliola consobrina  
 Drilliola crispata (De Cristofori & Jan, 1832)
 Drilliola difficilis (E. A. Smith, 1879)
  Drilliola elegantula de Boury, 1899
Drilliola emendata 
  Drilliola estotiensis  
 Drilliola exquisita Poppe & Tagaro, 2021
 Drilliola labradorae Poppe & Tagaro, 2021
 Drilliola loprestiana 
 Drilliola mactanensis Poppe & Tagaro, 2021
  Drilliola mammicula  
   Drilliola mangaoparia 
  Drilliola maoria  
 Drilliola multispiralis Poppe & Tagaro, 2021
  Drilliola obesa  
  Drilliola ponticensis  
  Drilliola pseudospirata  
  Drilliola pukeuriensis  
 Drilliola reevii (C. B. Adams, 1850)
  Drilliola rupta  
  Drilliola sedentaria  
  Drilliola sola  
  Drilliola speyeri   
  Drilliola subsedentaria  
  Drilliola subturrella  
  Drilliola terranigra 
 Drilliola tersa (Woodring, 1928)
 Drilliola trina (Mansfield, 1925)
  Drilliola turrella 
 Drilliola zeuxippe (Dall, 1919)

Species brought into synonymy 
 Drilliola comatotropis : synonym of Drilliola loprestiana 
 Drilliola megalacma : synonym of Retidrillia megalacme   
 Drilliola pruina : synonym of Retidrillia pruina 
 Drilliola pulchella  : synonym of Drilliola lopprestiana

References

 Locard A. (1897-1898). Expéditions scientifiques du Travailleur et du Talisman pendant les années 1880, 1881, 1882 et 1883. Mollusques testacés. Paris, Masson. vol. 1 [1897], p. 1-516 pl. 1-22; vol. 2 [1898], p. 1-515, pl. 1-18
 Cossmann (M.) & Pissarro (G.), 1913 Iconographie complète des coquilles fossiles de l'Éocène des environs de Paris, t. 2, p. pl. 46-65
Révision des pleurotomes éocènes du Bassin de Paris (suite). La Feuille des Jeunes Naturalistes 29(340): 62-65, sér. 3
 Bouchet P. & Warén A. (1980). Revision of the North-East Atlantic bathyal and abyssal Turridae (Mollusca: Gastropoda). Journal of Molluscan Studies Suppl. 8: 1-119 (December) page(s): 32
 Gofas, S.; Le Renard, J.; Bouchet, P. (2001). Mollusca, in: Costello, M.J. et al. (Ed.) (2001). European register of marine species: a check-list of the marine species in Europe and a bibliography of guides to their identification. Collection Patrimoines Naturels, 50: pp. 180–213
 Lewy, Z. 1975. Molluscs distribution on the Atlantic continental shelf off Southern Spanish Sahara, West Africa. Meteor Forschungsergebnisse, Deutsche Forschungsgemeinschaft, Reihe C Geologie und Geophysik, Gebrüder Bornträger, Berlin, Stuttgart C21: 52-60.
 Le Renard (J.) & Pacaud (J.-M.), 1995 Révision des Mollusques paléogènes du Bassin de Paris. 2 - Liste des références primaires des espèces. Cossmanniana, t. 3, vol. 3, p. 65-132 (
 Lozouet, P., 1999. - Nouvelles espèces de gastéropodes (Mollusca: Gastropoda) de l'Oligocène et du Miocène inférieur d'Aquitaine (sud-ouest de la France). Partie 2. Cossmanniana 6(1-2): 1-68

External links
 Kantor Y.I., Harasewych M.G. & Puillandre N. (2016). A critical review of Antarctic Conoidea (Neogastropoda). Molluscan Research. 36(3): 153-206

 
Gastropod genera